Bang Bai Mai is a tambon (subdistrict) of Mueang Surat Thani District, Surat Thani Province, southern Thailand.

History & toponymy
It is said that Bang Bai Mai in the past, there was a warlord who migrated his family from neighbouring Nakhon Si Thammarat to settle here, because it is a fertile area suitable for cultivation and he himself has had descendants inherited to the present.

Its name "Bang Bai Mai" means "place of leaves", owing to the large number of leaves piled up in the khlong (canal) that flows through the area.

Geography
Most of the area is a lowland with a river running through it. Along both sides of the Khlong Bang Bai Mai is mixed deciduous forest.

Its adjacent places, clockwise from the north, are Bang Sai, Bang Chana, Tapi River, and Bang Sai again. All are within its district.

Bang Bai Mai earned the nickname "Khlong Roi Sai" (คลองร้อยสาย, "a hundred canals") because there are hundreds of small waterways connected to each other. All of them flow to confluence the Tapi River, a main watercourse.

Administration
Bang Bai Mai is governed by two local government bodies: Surat Thani City Municipality and  Subdistrict Administrative Organization (SAO) Bang Bai Mai.

As for the SAO Bang Bai Mai, there are still five muban (village).

Places
Wat Bang Bai Mai
Ko Lamphu
Surat Thani City Pillar Shrine

References

External links
 

Tambon of Surat Thani Province